Saline County is located along the Missouri River in the U.S. state of Missouri. As of the 2010 census, the population was 23,370. Its county seat is Marshall. The county was established November 25, 1820, and named for the region's salt springs.

Settled primarily by migrants from the Upper South during the nineteenth century, this county was in the region bordering the Missouri River known as "Little Dixie". In the antebellum years, it had many plantations operated with the forced labor of enslaved workers. One-third of the county population was African American at the start of the American Civil War, but their proportion of the residents has declined dramatically to little more than five percent.

Saline County comprises the Marshall, Missouri Micropolitan Statistical Area.

History
Saline County was occupied for thousands of years by succeeding cultures of Missouri Native Americans. Saline County was organized by European-American settlers on November 25, 1820, and was named from the salinity of the springs found in the region. After periods of conflict as settlers competed for resources and encroached on their territory, the local Native Americans, including the Osage nation, were forced by the U.S. government to move to reservations in Indian Territory, first in Kansas and then in Oklahoma.

Saline County was among several along the Missouri River that were settled primarily by migrants from the Upper South states of Kentucky, Tennessee and Virginia. The settlers quickly started cultivating crops similar to those in Middle Tennessee and Kentucky: hemp and tobacco; they had brought enslaved people with them to central Missouri, or purchased them from slave traders. These counties settled by southerners became known as "Little Dixie." By the time of the Civil War, one-third of the county population was African American; most of them were enslaved laborers on major plantations, particularly for labor-intensive tobacco cultivation. In 1847 the state legislature had prohibited any African Americans from being educated.

After the war, freedmen and other residents had a hunger for education. The state's new constitution established public education for all citizens for the first time. It was segregated, in keeping with local custom. Each township with 20 or more African-American students were supposed to establish a school for them, but rural areas lagged in the number of schools and jurisdictions underfunded those for blacks. By the early 20th century, Saline County had eighteen schools for black students. The remaining black schools from the Jim Crow era have been studied by the State Historic Preservation Office and many are being nominated to the National Register of Historic Places.

Geography
It is located along the Missouri River.

Adjacent counties
Carroll County (northwest)
Chariton County (northeast)
Howard County (east)
Cooper County (southeast)
Pettis County (south)
Lafayette County (west)

Major highways
 Interstate 70
 U.S. Route 40
 U.S. Route 65
 Route 20
 Route 41
 Route 127
 Route 240

National protected area
Big Muddy National Fish and Wildlife Refuge (part)

Demographics
The largely rural county reached its peak of population in 1930, and has slowly declined since then since mechanization of farming has meant that fewer workers are needed; from about 1910 to the 1970s, African Americans often moved to larger urban areas for work and better social conditions.

At the 2000 census, there were 23,756 people, 9,015 households and 6,013 families residing in the county. The population density was 31 per square mile (12/km2). There were 10,019 housing units at an average density of 13 per square mile (5/km2). The racial makeup of the county was 90.03% White, 5.39% Black or African American, 0.31% Native American, 0.35% Asian, 0.21% Pacific Islander, 2.09% from other races, and 1.62% from two or more races. Approximately 4.42% of the population were Hispanic or Latino of any race. 28.7% were of German, 18.2% American, 9.8% English and 9.3% Irish ancestry.

There were 9,015 households, of which 30.60% had children under the age of 18 living with them, 51.90% were married couples living together, 10.30% had a female householder with no husband present, and 33.30% were non-families. 28.20% of all households were made up of individuals, and 14.60% had someone living alone who was 65 years of age or older. The average household size was 2.45 and the average family size was 2.97.

In Age distribution was 24.30% under the age of 18, 12.00% from 18 to 24, 25.20% from 25 to 44, 22.30% from 45 to 64, and 16.30% who were 65 years of age or older. The median age was 37 years. For every 100 females there were 96.10 males. For every 100 females age 18 and over, there were 93.70 males.

The median household income was $32,743, and the median family income was $39,234. Males had a median income of $27,180 versus $19,431 for females. The per capita income for the county was $16,132. About 10.50% of families and 13.20% of the population were below the poverty line, including 18.90% of those under age 18 and 8.60% of those age 65 or over.

2020 Census

Education

Public schools
Gilliam C-4 School District – Gilliam
Gilliam Elementary School (K-08)
Hardeman R-X School District – Marshall
Hardeman Elementary School (PK-08)
Malta Bend R-V School District – Malta Bend
Malta Bend Elementary School (PK-05)
Malta Bend High School (06-12)
Marshall School District – Marshall
Eastwood Elementary School (PK-03)
Benton Elementary School (K-01)
Northwest Elementary School (K-04)
Southeast Elementary School (K-02)
Bueker Middle School (05-08)
Marshall High School (09-12)
Orearville R-IV School District – Slater
Orearville Elementary School (K-08)
Slater Public Schools – Slater
Slater Elementary School (PK-08)
Slater High School (09-12)
Sweet Springs R-VII School District – Sweet Springs
Sweet Springs Elementary School (PK-06)
Sweet Springs High School (07-12)

Private schools
Calvary Baptist School – Marshall (PK-10) – Baptist (Alternative School)
St. Peter Catholic School – Marshall (K-09) – Roman Catholic

Post-secondary
Missouri Valley College – Marshall – A private, four-year Presbyterian university.

Public libraries
Marshall Public Library  
Slater Public Library  
Sweet Springs Public Library

Politics

Local
The Democratic Party predominantly controls politics at the local level in Saline County. Democrats hold all but four of the elected positions in the county.

State

Saline County is divided into two legislative districts in the Missouri House of Representatives, both represented by Republicans.

District 48 — Dave Muntzel (R-Boonville). Consists of the communities of Arrow Rock, Gilliam, Miami, Nelson, and Slater.

District 51 — Dean Dohrman (R-La Monte). Consists of the communities of Blackburn, Emma, Grand Pass, Malta Bend, Marshall, Mt. Leonard, and Sweet Springs.

All of Saline County is a part of Missouri's 21st District in the Missouri Senate and is currently represented by Denny Hoskins (R-Warrensburg).

Federal

All of Saline County is included in Missouri's 5th Congressional District, which is represented by Emanuel Cleaver (D-Kansas City) in the U.S. House of Representatives.

Communities

Cities

Blackburn (small part in Lafayette County)
Emma (partly in Lafayette County)
Malta Bend
Marshall (county seat)
Miami
Nelson
Slater
Sweet Springs

Villages

Arrow Rock
Gilliam
Grand Pass
Mount Leonard

Unincorporated communities

Blue Lick
Elmwood
Fairville
Hardeman
Herndon
Marshall Junction
McAllister Springs
Napton
New Frankfort
Norton
Orearville
Pennytown
Ridge Prairie
Saline City
Salt Springs
Shackleford
Sharon

See also
National Register of Historic Places listings in Saline County, Missouri

References

Further reading
 Napton, William Barclay. Past and Present of Saline County Missouri. (1910) full text

External links
 Digitized 1930 Plat Book of Saline County  from University of Missouri Division of Special Collections, Archives, and Rare Books
 Saline County Sheriff's Office

 
Little Dixie (Missouri)
Missouri counties on the Missouri River
1820 establishments in Missouri Territory
Populated places established in 1820